Columbus North High School is a public high school building located on the north side of Columbus, Ohio at 100 E. Arcadia Avenue. It is part of the Columbus City School District. The school was closed in 1979 due to declining enrollment.

In December 1921, the Columbus Board of Education purchased a thirteen-acre tract of land on Arcadia Ave., which included the old Columbus Sewer Pipe Factory, for $39,000.  Famed architect, Frank Packard designed the building, of Tudor Revival architecture, costing approximately $1,000,000. Construction began in 1923 and the building opened on September 2, 1924.  It graduated its first class in January 1925.

The North High School building served as an adult education center for many years. From 2006-2008 the North building was used as swing space by East High School during the renovation of the East High School building. Linden-McKinley High School used the building as swing space from 2009-2011 during the renovation of the Linden-McKinley building.

From 2012–2019, the North High School building was the home of Columbus North International High School. Columbus North International moved to the former Brookhaven High School building in 2019. The North High School building was renovated, and is now home to Dominion Middle School.

Bishop Watterson High School rents use of the stadium at North High School from Columbus City Schools for their home football games.

North High School won the first state Ohio High School Athletic Association track and field championship shortly after the formation of the association. The school also had an undefeated football season in 1918 under Coach Errett Selby.

Athletic State championships

 Boys Track and Field – 1908, 1911
 Boys Golf – 1932, 1944, 1945, 1946
 Boys Baseball – 1940
 Boys Gymnastics - 1926, 1927, 1932

See also
Schools in Columbus, Ohio

References

External links
 
Dominion Middle School website

High schools in Columbus, Ohio
School buildings on the National Register of Historic Places in Ohio
Tudor Revival architecture in Ohio
1924 establishments in Ohio
Frank Packard buildings
Defunct schools in Ohio
National Register of Historic Places in Columbus, Ohio
Columbus Register properties
Old North Columbus